Mark Bradshaw may refer to:

Mark Bradshaw (composer) (born 1983), Australian film composer
Mark Bradshaw (cricketer) (born 1973), Australian cricketer
Mark Bradshaw (diver) (born 1962), American Olympic diver
Mark Bradshaw (footballer) (born 1969), English former professional footballer and manager
Mark Bradshaw (figure skater)